Kasem may refer to:

Language 
 Kasem language, Gur language spoken in Burkina Faso and Ghana

People
 Casey Kasem (1932–2014), American radio personality and voice actor
 Kazi Abul Kasem (1913–2003), Bengali painter and cartoonist
 Kasim, Kasem appears as a spelling of the name Kasim
 Mike Kasem, Arab VJ

Places
 Kasem Bundit University in Bangkok, Thailand
 Nakhon Kasem, Bangkok market
 Kasem, Trakan Phuet Phon - Ubon Ratchathani Province, Thailand